Kalocyrma oxygonia is a moth in the family Lecithoceridae. It was described by Chun-Sheng Wu and Kyu-Tek Park in 1999. It is found in Sri Lanka.

The wingspan is about 9 mm. The forewings are ochreous with the costal margin brown and a brownish pattern. The cell dot is well defined and there are two discocellular spots, one near the inner margin. The hindwings are light grey.

Etymology
The species name is derived from Greek oxys (meaning sharp).

References

Moths described in 1999
Kalocyrma